Romanija  may refer to:
Romanija, a mountain and geographical region in Republika Srpska, Bosnia and Herzegovina
Ravna Romanija, a village in the municipality of Sokolac, Republika Srpska, Bosnia and Herzegovina
SAO Romanija

See also
Podromanija, a village in the municipality of Sokolac, Republika Srpska, Bosnia and Herzegovina
Romania (disambiguation)